Anna Guseva is a Russian distance swimmer. At the 2012 Summer Olympics, she competed in the Women's marathon 10 kilometre, finishing in 10th place. Trained by Elezarova Galina Alekseievna.

References

Russian female long-distance swimmers
Year of birth missing (living people)
Living people
Olympic swimmers of Russia
Female long-distance swimmers